Porsche Lynn (born February 14, 1962) is an American exotic dancer and pornographic actress.

Career
Lynn chose her stage name from the Porsche car company after seeing one of their cars during a drive to one of her earliest film shoots; she added "Lynn" to it as it fitted well.

Between 1985 and 2002, Lynn appeared in about 170 adult films. Lynn is a member of the AVN Hall of Fame and the XRCO Hall of Fame.

Awards
 1988 XRCO Award - Starlet of the Year
 1989 XRCO Award Best Female/Female Sex Scene for movie The Kink with Lynn LeMay
 1994 AVN Award - Best Supporting Actress—Video (Servin' it Up)

References

External links

 
 
 

American pornographic film actresses
Living people
People from St. Johns, Michigan
American female erotic dancers
American erotic dancers
1962 births
Pornographic film actors from Michigan
21st-century American women